William Norris "Bill" Boland (born July 16, 1933 at Corpus Christi, Texas) is a retired American Hall of Fame jockey and trainer in Thoroughbred horse racing.

Boland began his riding career in 1949 at Belmont Park in Elmont, New York. While still a sixteen-year-old apprentice, riding Better Self for owner Robert J. Kleberg Jr.'s King Ranch and trainer Max Hirsch, Boland earned the first stakes race win of his career on April 29, 1950 in the Gallant Fox Handicap at Jamaica Race Course. He went on to the Kentucky Oaks aboard Ari's Mona  then the following day rode Middleground to victory in the Kentucky Derby. Boland missed winning the U.S. Triple Crown series that year when he and Middleground finished second after a rough trip in the Preakness Stakes but then won the Belmont Stakes. In 1966 Boland won his second Belmont Stakes aboard Amberoid for trainer Lucien Laurin.

Widely respected by his peers, in 1959 Bill Boland received the George Woolf Memorial Jockey Award given to the North American jockey who demonstrates high standards of personal and professional conduct, on and off the racetrack.

Bill Boland retired from racing in 1969 and turned to training horses for a time. He was inducted into the United States Racing Hall of Fame in 2006.

References

1933 births
Living people
American jockeys
United States Thoroughbred Racing Hall of Fame inductees
People from Corpus Christi, Texas